Lya Fett Luft (15 September 1938 – 30 December 2021) was a Brazilian writer and a prolific translator, working mostly in the English-Portuguese and the German-Portuguese language combinations.

Life and career 
Lya Fett was born on 15 September 1938 in Santa Cruz do Sul (Rio Grande do Sul) which was largely settled by German-speaking immigrants, beginning in the first half of the 19th century. A notable percentage of the population there speak both German and Portuguese, including Fett's family. She later moved to Porto Alegre, where she lived until her death. She was a college professor of linguistics and literature, and wrote an opinion column for Veja magazine. Luft's literary work has been translated into other European languages, including German, English and Italian.

Death 
Lya Luft suffered a heart attack in 2019. She died at her home in Porto Alegre two years later at age 83, on 30 December 2021, from melanoma.

Bibliography
Works she produced in Portuguese:

 Canções de Limiar, 1964
 Flauta Doce, 1972
 Matéria do Cotidiano, 1978
 As Parceiras, 1980
 A Asa Esquerda do Anjo, 1981
 Reunião de Família, 1982
 O Quarto Fechado, 1984
 Mulher no Palco, 1984
 Exílio, 1987
 O Lado Fatal, 1989
 O Rio do Meio, 1996
 Secreta Mirada, 1997
 O Ponto Cego, 1999
 Histórias do Tempo, 2000
 Mar de dentro, 2000
 Perdas e Ganhos, 2003
 Histórias de Bruxa Boa, 2004
 Pensar é Transgredir, 2004
 Para não Dizer Adeus, 2005

References

External links

 Gezeiten des Glücks: Ein erfülltes Leben, Lya Luft. Site in German. Accessed on November 4, 2005.
 L’ALA SINISTRA DELL’ANGELO, a novel by Lya Luft. This site in Italian, was accessed on December 23, 2005.
 Lya Luft: "A cultura alemã me influenciou muito". Site in Portuguese, accessed on July 2, 2006.

1938 births
2021 deaths
20th-century Brazilian novelists
20th-century Brazilian women writers
21st-century Brazilian novelists
21st-century Brazilian women writers
People from Santa Cruz do Sul
Brazilian people of German descent
Translators to Portuguese
Brazilian women novelists
Pontifical Catholic University of Rio Grande do Sul alumni
Federal University of Rio Grande do Sul alumni
Deaths from melanoma
Deaths from cancer in Rio Grande do Sul